Christian Monzon is an American film and television actor and model.

Career

Modeling
Christian appeared at IMTA (International Modeling and Talent Association) in New York in the summer of 1997. There he attracted several modeling agencies worldwide, including NEXT Model Management in Los Angeles, New York, Miami, and Paris. He left NEXT after two years and signed with Bleu Models where he has been for the last eleven years.

He has appeared in advertising campaigns for Skechers, Abercrombie & Fitch, Perry Ellis, Sean John, Phat Farm, Versace, H&M, Exte, Banana Republic, GAP, a major Xelebri campaign directed by David Fincher and Dolce & Gabbana .

Monzon has worked with many of the world's best photographers and supermodels. The list includes Kate Moss, Gisele Bundchen, Naomi Campbell, Christy Turlington and Fernanda Tavares, with whom he shared the coveted fragrance campaign for Dolce & Gabbana.

Christian credits his relationship with Dolce & Gabbana as the turning point in his career. In 2001 he was introduced to designers Domenico Dolce and Steffano Gabbana during fashion week in Milan, Italy. That same year he was offered a contract to represent the company as their underwear model, which led to one of three fragrance campaigns and two short movies, advertising the 'Classic Perfume' for men and a new fragrance for women, 'Sicily.' The short movies were directed by Giuseppe Tornatore, who won an Oscar for Cinema Paradiso in 1988, and starred Monica Bellucci and Fernanda Tavares.

Theatrical

After enjoying success on the runways of the fashion circuit (Milan, Paris, and New York) and spending time on set of commercials and music videos, Christian turned his focus on the theatrical world. Through his studies of the craft at the Carter Thor Studio in Los Angeles, he has established himself and paved the path for an acting career. Monzon's reverence for the art of storytelling has presented several opportunities along the lines of producing and writing. Christian established Wyndotte St. Productions in 2002. Wyndotte St. Productions has several projects in the developmental stage; two of which were written and conceived by Christian.

Monzon describes acting and storytelling, not just as a communication device, but also as a tool that leads to self-knowledge and understanding. To date his film credits include independent features If I Had Known I Was a Genius opposite Academy Award-winning actresses Sharon Stone and Whoopi Goldberg, Kill Speed opposite Andrew Keegan and Greg Gruenberg, Columbia Tri-Star's XXX: State of the Union, Universal's Honey, and Hallmark's The Reading Room and The Deadliest Lesson opposite Penelope Ann Miller. His television appearances have included guest starring roles on such critically acclaimed series’, CSI: Miami, CSI: NY, Crossing Jordan, Entourage, Law and Order SVU, Showtime/Sony's Huff, Three Rivers, and the series finale of Dollhouse.

Filmography

Film

Television

References

"Male Supermodels: Christian Monzon"
"Christian Monzon : From Top Model to Up and Coming Actor"
"Poster Boy Pin-Up"
"New York Times.com Filmography January 18, 2010 Movies & TV"
"Cultural Change" at Banana Republic"
"Three Rivers - Episode 1.04 - Press Release"
"Dolce&Gabbana model Christian Monzon in cellphone ad"
"Christian Monzon Models for Fashion for Relief"
"Dollhouse 2.13 "Epitaph Two: The Return"
" La Milonga Brings Romance and Tango to the Miami Short Film Festival"

External links 
 "Christian Monzon's official website"
 "Christian Monzon's official YouTube site"
 

Living people
Male actors from Burbank, California
American male film actors
American male television actors
Male models from California
Year of birth missing (living people)